George Bancroft, also known as George Bancrafte (died 1573?) was an English clergyman and translator.

Life
He was rector of Grittleton, Wiltshire, and chaplain to William Parr, 1st Marquess of Northampton, in the 1540s. Under Mary I of England Bancroft was sheltered by the patronage of Andrew Baynton, having a living at Bromham when he lost that at Grittleton. Under Elizabeth I of England his position then improved.

Works
Bancroft translated into English as The answere that the preachers of the gospel at Basile made (1548) the Latin Protestant polemic Responsio Prædicatorum Basileensium in defensionem rectæ Administrationis Cœnee Dominicæ, defending the Reformation at Basle, and attacking Catholic views of the Eucharist.

References

Attribution

Year of birth missing
16th-century English translators
16th-century English Anglican priests
1573 deaths